Edith van Dijk (born 6 April 1973 in Haastrecht) is a Dutch swimmer and 6-fold world champion. She is Holland's most successful open water swimmer and long distance swimmer, whose career started in 1990 taking part in the Dutch IJsselmeermarathon.

Biography
She starts out at Gouda's swimming club DONK, the swimming portion of the soccer team of the same name. At DONK teammates gave her the nickname Piaf, due to her having the same first name as Edith Piaf. She was invested as a Knight of the Order of Orange Nassau and was awarded a Doctorate in Economy from Erasmus University in Rotterdam.

In the years following the 1990 IJsselmeermarathon she finds her place between the world's top. Her definitive breakthrough is during the European championships of 1995 in Vienna, where she wins the silver medal on the longest distance in open water swimming, that of 25 kilometer. The next high is reached in less than three years in Perth, where she wins two medals at the world championships: silver on the 5 kilometer and bronze on the 25 kilometer.

Another two years later, when first separate open water world championships were held off the coast of Hawaii, she hit on the 10 and 25 kilometers. From then on, Van Dijk – living in Wognum and competing for the club SG Hoorn/Zeemacht, always stood on the podium at every major international tournament. In addition to this she also decorated herself with high classifications in the World Cup circuit, including ultra-long races, of more than seventy kilometers in Argentina and Brazil. In 2001, 2002, and 2003 she is nominated for the honor title of Dutch Female Sporter of the Year.

Erica Terpstra, herself a top swimmer, performed the wedding ceremony, wedding Edith with Hans van Goor on 20 March 2003 in Oudewater, Netherlands.

On 13 August 2003 she swam across the English Channel between Calais and Dover. In a time of 9 hours and 8 minutes (official time) she reached the French Coast. She had aimed to improve the official Dutch and European Record by her husband and coach Hans van Goor, who performed the same crossing in 1995 in a time of 8 hours and 2 minutes.

After her Channel-adventure Van Dijk attempted to qualify for the 2004 Summer Olympics in Athens. In spite of her training efforts she did not manage to qualify; she was not fast enough for even the longest distance of pool swimming, the 800 meters freestyle.

In 2005, she decided to end her long and impressive career. She closed it in style: at the world championships of 2005 in Montreal she won the bronze in the 5 kilometers, and gold on both the 10 and 25 kilometers, thereby annoying her everlasting rival from Germany with whom she fought a number of duels, Britta Kamrau. The last race of Holland's most praised marathon swimmer was in December 2005 at the Dutch Short Course Championships (25 meter pool) in Amsterdam.

At the end of 2005, the leading American magazine Swimming World names her long-distance swimmer of the year.

On 22 December 2005 she was elected Sport female of the year 2005. The jury composed of Dutch top athletes chose her instead of judoka Edith Bosch (World and European Champion in 2005) and rower Marit van Eupen (World champion in 2005).

Edith also played a role in the 2006 Argentinian Movie Agua where she plays herself in a documentary about swimmers, doing an interview about her life as a swimmer.

In August 2007, she announced her comeback, in order to try to win an Olympic medal at the 2008 Summer Olympics. In Beijing, open water swimming featured on the Olympic program for the first time. Despite winning a silver medal in the 25 km at the 2008 world championships three months before the Olympics, she finished only 14th in the Olympic 10 km.

Personal bests 
Below is a listing of the top times that Edith achieved in her career.
The time format is in hours:minutes:seconds:milliseconds as is common for swimming times.
Note that there is a big difference between pool types. Indoor pools of 25 m give the advantage of being able to use the turning point to push off again using ones legs, thus giving a clear advantage over 50 m and of course open water venues. Open sea gives the really bad side effect of large waves and the tides, which will sometimes push the swimmer back to where they came from, this can be clearly seen in the differences in times between the Channel crossing and the almost double in length Maraton Acuatica Rio Coronda which she performed in two hours less.

See also
 World Open Water Championships - Multiple medalists

References
 
 Zwemkroniek profile (Dutch Swim Chronicle)
 Edith's Career 
 De Goudse Zwem en Poloclub Donk 

1973 births
Living people
Dutch female freestyle swimmers
Dutch female long-distance swimmers
Olympic swimmers of the Netherlands
Swimmers at the 2008 Summer Olympics
English Channel swimmers
People from Vlist
People from Wognum
World Aquatics Championships medalists in open water swimming
Sportspeople from South Holland
21st-century Dutch women